Nene Chicken is a South Korean-based international fried chicken restaurant franchise. From November 2018, Nene Chicken decided to go with NU'EST W and SEVENTEEN as a model.

International locations 
Franchises outside South Korea currently exist in Canada, United Arab Emirates, Hong Kong, Malaysia, Singapore, Australia, and Japan.

References

External links

Nene Chicken Australia
Nene Chicken Singapore

Fast-food chains of South Korea
Fast-food poultry restaurants